The 1992 Mitropa Cup was the 50th and last season of the Mitropa football club tournament. It was won by Borac Banja Luka who beat BVSC Budapest in the final 1–1 (5–3 after penalty shoot-out).

Semi-finals 
Matches played on 27 May 1992.

|}

Final

See also
1991–92 European Cup
1991–92 European Cup Winners' Cup
1991–92 UEFA Cup

External links
1992 Mitropa Cup at Rec.Sport.Soccer Statistics Foundation

1992
1991–92 in European football
1991–92 in Hungarian football
1991–92 in Yugoslav football
1991–92 in Czechoslovak football
1991–92 in Italian football